Pierre Roland Larouche (born November 16, 1955) is a Canadian former professional ice hockey forward who played in the National Hockey League for the Pittsburgh Penguins, Montreal Canadiens, Hartford Whalers, and New York Rangers between 1974 and 1988. He was a two-time Stanley Cup winner with the Canadiens.

Hockey career
As a youth, Larouche played in the 1965, 1966 and 1968 Quebec International Pee-Wee Hockey Tournaments with a minor ice hockey team from Amos, Quebec.

Larouche played junior ice hockey with the Sorel Éperviers of the Quebec Major Junior Hockey League. During the 1973–74 QMJHL season, Larouche won the Jean Béliveau Trophy as the league's top scorer, with 94 goals, 157 assists, for a total 251 points. Larouche set the Canadian Hockey League record at the time, which is now second only to Mario Lemieux's 282 points ten years later.

Larouche was drafted 8th overall by the Penguins in the 1974 NHL amateur draft. In 1976, he became the 16th player to reach the 50-goal mark. At the time he was the youngest player to hit the 50-goal and 100-points plateau. His record was broken by Wayne Gretzky in 1980. He was first player to score 50 goals in a season with two teams: he scored 53 with Pittsburgh in 1975–76 and 50 with Montreal in 1979–80. and is the only NHL player to have scored more than 45 goals with three different teams, also scoring 48 with the New York Rangers.

Larouche is also one of the few players to score at least a point-per-game average in his final NHL season. He had 12 points in 10 games, during the 1987–88 NHL season, his last in the league. He won two Stanley Cups with Montreal in 1978 and 1979.

In the 2009 book 100 Ranger Greats, the authors ranked Larouche at No. 94 all-time of the 901 New York Rangers who had played during the team's first 82 seasons.

On December 31, 2010 he served as one of the coaches for the alumni game of the 2011 NHL Winter Classic at Heinz Field between the Penguins and Washington Capitals.

Records and accomplishments
 He was the youngest player in NHL history to score 100 goals (21 years, 61 days) until he was surpassed by Wayne Gretzky (20 years, 40 days).
 He was the youngest player in NHL history to score 50 goals (20 years, 139 days) and 100 points (20 years, 129 days) in a season until he was passed by Wayne Gretzky in both categories.
 He was the youngest player in NHL history to score 200 points (21 years, 32 days) until he was surpassed by Wayne Gretzky (19 years, 347 days).
 He was the youngest player in NHL history to score 300 points (22 years, 133 days) until he was surpassed by Bryan Trottier (22 years, 102 days).
 Holds the Montreal Canadiens record for most goals in a season by a center with 50 goals in 1979-80
 Holds the New York Rangers record for most goals in a season by a center with 48 goals in 1983-84
 1st player in NHL history to score 50 goals with 2 teams (PIT & MTL) as well as 45 goals with 3 teams (PIT, MTL & NYR).
 Held the QMJHL record for points in a season with 251 in 1973-74 until he was surpassed by Mario Lemieux with 282 points in 1983-84.
 Holds the QMJHL record for assists in a season with 157 in 1973-74

Career statistics

Regular season and playoffs

International

Golf career
After retiring from hockey, Larouche took up golf. He was a winning player on the Celebrity Player Tour and he nearly qualified for the U. S. Open in 1993.

See also
List of NHL players with 100-point seasons

References

 

Notes

External links

1955 births
Canadian ice hockey centres
Hartford Whalers players
Hershey Bears players
Houston Aeros draft picks
Ice hockey people from Quebec
Living people
Montreal Canadiens players
National Hockey League first-round draft picks
New York Rangers players
People from Abitibi-Témiscamingue
Pittsburgh Penguins draft picks
Pittsburgh Penguins players
Quebec Remparts players
Sorel Éperviers players
Stanley Cup champions